Uranium City Airport  is located  east of Uranium City, Saskatchewan, Canada. It is classified as a Code 2 airport.

The airport was built by Eldorado Mining and Refining Limited in the 1950s to support the growing mining operations around Uranium City. Transport Canada assumed ownership in the 1970s.

After the loss of the community's mining industry, Uranium City began a sharp depopulation. The Saskatchewan provincial government assumed ownership of the airport in early 1997 from Transport Canada.

See also 
 List of airports in Saskatchewan
 Uranium City Water Aerodrome

References

External links

Certified airports in Saskatchewan
Uranium City, Saskatchewan